Mirko Savini (born 11 March 1979) is a former Italian footballer who played as defender, currently working for Ascoli as an assistant coach.

Career
Savini spent most of his early career playing at lower division level, and reached Serie B only in 2002 with Ascoli. He was then signed by Serie B fallen giants Fiorentina in 2004, where he achieved promotion to the top flight, but then he chose to join Napoli instead, where he became protagonist of the club's comeback to Serie A; with Napoli, he finally had the chance to mark his debut in the Italian top flight. He left Napoli in January 2009 to accept a 6-month contract with another Serie A club, Palermo, but this was not extended at the end of the season and he left the Sicilians in a free transfer in July 2009.

He was player of Greek club PAOK FC, from July 2009 until August 2011, when he terminated his contract with the club. During his PAOK spells, Savini was mostly used as a second choice for a left-back or a center-back. Nevertheless, whenever he was called upon to fill in, he pulled out very positive appearances.

Retirement
In 2012, he became a coaching assistant of the reserve team of Pescara Calcio. He obtained certificate to coach youth team on 30 June 2012. After Cristian Bucchi was promoted to the first team as head coach in March 2013, Savini and Ermanno Ciotti, both assistants of Bucchi in the reserve, became the new Collaboratori tecnici of the first team. He successively followed on Bucchi's footsteps at his assistant at all his jobs, the most recent one being in 2022–23 at Ascoli.

References

External links 
 Gazzetta Dello Sport – 2006–07 Player Profile
 Gazzetta dello Sport – 2008–09 Player Profile

1979 births
Living people
Italian footballers
Italian expatriate footballers
Ascoli Calcio 1898 F.C. players
ACF Fiorentina players
S.S.C. Napoli players
Palermo F.C. players
Serie A players
Serie B players
Association football defenders
Footballers from Rome
Fermana F.C. players
PAOK FC players
Super League Greece players
Expatriate footballers in Greece
Italian football managers